Atelopus halihelos, the Morona-Santiago stubfoot toad, is a species of toad in the family Bufonidae endemic to Ecuador. Its natural habitats are subtropical or tropical moist montane forests and rivers. It is threatened by habitat loss.

References

halihelos
Amphibians of Ecuador
Amphibians described in 1973
Endemic fauna of Ecuador
Taxonomy articles created by Polbot